In order for artwork to appear in film or television, filmmakers must go through a process of acquiring permission from artists, their estates or whoever the owner of the photographic rights may be, lest they become embroiled in a potential lawsuit, such as was the case for Warner Bros. with sculptor Frederick Hart following the reproduction of his piece Ex Nihilo in Devil's Advocate, as well as with the designer of Mike Tyson's face tattoo following its reproduction in The Hangover Part II. For this reason, more often than not, actors portraying artists are shown with work created by a professional painter, comics artist or sculptor specifically for a film or series, and galleries may frequently display artwork created for the project or otherwise in the public domain.

The following is a list of notable artists who contributed artwork specifically for feature films and television.

References

Film
Film-related lists